The Old Fool is a 1923 American silent Western film directed by Edward D. Venturini and starring James O. Barrows, Lloyd Hughes and Jim Mason.

Plot 
Grandad Steele, an American Civil War veteran, moves to Texas in his retirement to live with his grandson John. The local sheriff, who is smuggling firearms across the Mexico–United States border, kidnaps John's girlfriend Mary. The Steeles chase him down and Grandad kills him with his Civil War saber.

Cast
 James O. Barrows as Grandad Steele 
 Henry Hunt as Peter Steele 
 Jim Mason as Henry Steele 
 Lloyd Hughes as John Steele 
 Barbara Tennant as Dora Steele  
 Betty Francisco sa Mary Manners 
 Ben Hendricks Jr. as Pete Harkins 
 Louise Fazenda as Dolores Murphy 
 O. V. Harrison as Larry Bellows 
 Monte Collins as Pop Hardy 
 Tom Mean as Rogers

References

External links
 

1923 films
1923 Western (genre) films
American black-and-white films
Films directed by Edward D. Venturini
Films distributed by W. W. Hodkinson Corporation
Silent American Western (genre) films
Films set in Texas
1920s American films